Pecki may refer to:

 Pečki, a village in Slovenia
 , a village near Petrinja, Croatia